Selmas saga was the Sveriges Television's Christmas calendar for 2016.

The knitted tuque worn by Selma Traskvist, the main character, in the series led to a temporary knitting boom.

The series was later sold to France, the Netherlands, Russia, the Czech Republic and Slovakia.

Plot 

The series is inspirerd by steampunk and set a fictional era, inspired by the early 20th century

It follows Selma Traskvist, an 8 years old young girl who goes out on an adventure in the airship "Valborg" from Sweden to the Arctic along with quirky professor Efraim von Trippelhatt trying to find Santa Claus.

Roles 
 Ester Vuori - Selma
 Johan Ulveson - Efraim von Trippelhatt
 Sofia Bach - Nordenstierne
 Pierre Tafvelin - Fabrikören Theodor Julius Hermelin
 Mikael Riesebeck - Pappa Traskvist
 Lotta Östlin - Mamma Traskvist
 Björn Gustafson - Morfar Otto
 Vilda Carleblank - Selmas lillasyster Signe
 Leo Hellenius - Rupert
 Viktor Friberg - Antikhandlare
 Stefan Roos - Kettil Felterus
 Shima Niavarani - Tomtevettingen
 Marienette Dahlin - Husvärdinnan
 Lisette Pagler - Journalisten
 Ing-Marie Carlsson - Valborg (Countess of Gruus)
 Nicke Wagemyr - Greven
 Meg Westergren - Alamandha
 Nils Eklund - Grimundius
 Carl Carlswärd - Herr Stubbgrå

References

External links 
 
 

2016 Swedish television series debuts
2016 Swedish television series endings
Sveriges Television's Christmas calendar
Television shows set in Sweden
Television shows set in the Arctic
Santa Claus in television
Steampunk television series